The Church of St Catherine is a Church of England parish church at Hoarwithy in the English county of Herefordshire. Alan Brooks and Nikolaus Pevsner, in the revised 2012 Herefordshire volume of the Pevsner Buildings of England series, describe it as "the most impressive Victorian church in the county. Designed in an Italian Romanesque style by the architect John Pollard Seddon for the Revd William Poole, vicar of Hentland with Hoarwithy, it is a Grade I listed building.

History
The original chapel on the site dated from the 1840s. Poole considered it, "an ugly brick building with no pretensions to any style of architecture." Coming into his inheritance in 1870, he commissioned Seddon to undertake a total rebuilding.  The building history is "unclear"; designs were exhibited at the Royal Academy in 1874, and the main building period appears to have completed between 1878 and 1879, although English Heritage records much work as post-dating 1885. Brooks and Pevsner consider that this may relate "largely to the internal decoration."  Work has continued into the 21st century with the addition of the "Dubricius" polyptych by the artist Edward Kelly, and the restoration of the organ.

Description
The church has an "imposing campanile" of four storeys, with the ground floor surrounded by an  open arcade. The church is constructed from local Red sandstone, which encases the brick structure of 1840.  A north porch is linked to the arcades of the campanile by a loggia. Historic England describes the design of the church as "eclectic Rundbogenstil [with] Byzantine, French, Venetian, Lombardic, Tuscan and Sicilian Romanesque influences." Simon Jenkins considers the church; "a complete work of revivalist art, rare for its date, an astonishing creation."

The churchyard contains five war graves, three British Army soldiers and a Royal Navy seaman of World War I and a Royal Naval Reserve officer of World War II.

Gallery

Notes

Sources

External links
 Article on the church from The Victorian Web

Hoarwithy
Diocese of Hereford
Grade I listed churches in Herefordshire
Romanesque architecture in England